The BET Award for Best International Act: Africa was an award given to honor the outstanding achievements of international artists from Africa every year before being combined with other BET Award international acts. Wizkid holds the record for most wins in this category.

In 2015, several African and UK artists criticized BET's treatment of them, saying that their awards were presented to them in a pre-recorded segment backstage. Nigerian popstar Yemi Alade called for an end to the category. BET's Rights & Research Administrator for  Business & Legal Affairs, Lilian Blankson, responded to the criticism in a series of tweets, denying that the award was given out backstage in a pre-recorded segment.

Winners and nominees
Winners are listed first and highlighted in bold.

2010s

Multiple wins and nominations

Most Wins
 2 wins
 Wizkid

Nominations

 4 nominations
 Wizkid
 Sarkodie

 3 nominations
 AKA

 2 nominations
 Yemi Alade
 Davido
 Ice Prince
 Fally Ipupa
 Diamond Platnumz
 Stonebwoy

See also
 BET Award for Best International Act: UK

References

BET Awards